Sadri Ahmeti (3 March 1939 24 June 2010) was an Albanian painter and poet from  Vusanje, Plavë, Gusinje of Montenegro.

Career
He was born in the village of Vusanje. In 1957 he emigrated to Albania. He worked as an agronomist in Berat and Krujë. 

As a modern painter and a watercolorist, he created his portraits of ladies named Muses or Albanian virgin beauties and also landscapes of his wondering fantasies and memories from the past in the technique of watercolor.

Death
Ahmeti died, age 71, in Tirana.

Painting exhibitions 
Ahmeti participated in several international collective exhibitions and opened personal ones in Belgium, Germany, Kosovo, Slovenia, Sweden, Turkey,  Sweden, Switzerland and the United States.

In Albania, he had sixteen solo exhibitions and participated in three collective exhibitions.

Awards 
In 1994, the National Art Gallery of Albania in Tirana presented Ahmeti the Onufri award.

Poetic publishings 

 1991 "The sun to Balkan does not shine through Goliotok"
 1993 "A laugh storms in the darkness"
 1993 "The iceberg of the Catastrophe's Prelude"
 1996 "The massacre of Tivar"
 1999 "33 years in Crucifix"
 2000 "The dance of Insanity"
 2000 "The wind plays with the leaves of my Fall"
 2000 "Will we meet tomorrow?"
2001 "Ridding around the world on a cloud"
2001 "While bathing in the silver of the Moon"

See also 

 Modern Albanian art
 List of Albanian painters
 List of Albanian poets
 Literature of Albania

References

External links 
 , his official website
 
 
 Essay
  
 vimeo.com Channel

Place of birth missing
1939 births
2010 deaths
20th-century Albanian poets
21st-century Albanian poets
Albanian male poets
Albanian landscape painters
Modern painters
People from Gusinje
People from Tirana
Albanian watercolourists
20th-century Albanian painters
21st-century Albanian painters
20th-century male writers
21st-century male writers
Albanians in Montenegro